"Tro" ("Faith") is an alternative rock song written by Swedish singer-songwriter Marie Fredriksson, released on 11 October 1996 by EMI as the first and only commercial single from her fifth studio album, I en tid som vår (1996). The song is about belief, although the lyric does not reference religion. The track was featured as the theme music to Colin Nutley's film Sånt är livet, who also directed its music video.

The song peaked at number eight and spent 29 weeks on the Swedish Singles Chart, making it the longest-charting single of her entire career, including her work as part of Roxette. It also performed well on Swedish radio, peaking at number eight on the Swedish Airplay Chart and at number twelve on Sveriges Radio's "Tracks" chart. In a 2018 online poll of Roxette fans, "Tro" was dubbed the fifth best song of Fredriksson's entire solo discography.

Track listing
All songs written by Marie Fredriksson.
 CD single 
 "Tro" – 4:48
 "Tid för försoning" – 4:13

Credits and personnel
Credits adapted from the liner notes of the CD single.

Musicians
 Marie Fredriksson – lead and background vocals, lyrics, composition, musical arrangement and production
 Mikael Bolyos – keyboards, engineering and production
 Staffan Astner – guitar
 Mats Kiesel – choir vocal arrangement and conducting
 Nicki Wallin – drums
 Nacka Musikklasser  and Nacka Musikskolas  – choir

Technical
 Kjell Andersson – sleeve design
 Mattias Edwall – photography
 Anders Hägglöv – choir recording and engineering 
 Alar Suurna – mixing

Charts

Covers
Swedish pop singer Shirley Clamp included her version of the track on her 2006 covers album Favoriter på svenska. She said of the song: "I can't find words to describe how beautiful it is", and said its lyric took on a deeper meaning after she was asked to perform the song at a funeral.

References

External links

1996 singles
1996 songs
2006 songs
Marie Fredriksson songs
Shirley Clamp songs
Songs written by Marie Fredriksson